"Surrounded" is a song by Canadian singer-songwriter Chantal Kreviazuk. It was released as the fourth single from Kreviazuk's debut studio album, Under These Rocks and Stones, in Canada on September 22, 1997, and peaked at number nine on the country's singles chart. It was Kreviazuk's first song to chart in the United States, where it was released in December the same year. The single achieved Platinum status in Canada for shipping over 100,000 units.

Composition
Kreviazuk revealed that the song was about the suicide of a former partner when she was 18 years old. She states, as of 2011, that she still has difficulties performing the song live.

Track listings
European CD single
 "Surrounded" – 5:18
 "Love Is All" – 2:56

European maxi-CD single
 "Surrounded" (radio edit) – 3:58
 "Love Is All" – 2:56
 "Surrounded" (acoustic) – 5:10

Charts

Weekly charts

Year-end charts

Certifications

Release history

References

1996 songs
1997 singles
Chantal Kreviazuk songs
Columbia Records singles
Epic Records singles
Songs about suicide
Songs written by Chantal Kreviazuk